Associazione Calcio Monza is an Italian professional football club based in Monza, Lombardy.

Monza first played in the Coppa Italia – the Italian domestic cup – in the 1926–27 season, where they reached the third round. The club was first promoted to the Serie B in 1951. Prior to their first Serie A promotion in 2022, Monza played 40 Serie B seasons throughout their history, the most of any Italian club without playing in the top flight. Monza have won the Coppa Italia Serie C a record four times, the Serie C championship four times, and an Anglo-Italian Cup.

This list details the club's placement in the league, the major national cups (Coppa Italia, Supercoppa Italiana), and other FIGC-sanctioned cups (Coppa Italia Serie C, Supercoppa di Serie C, and Coppa Italia Serie D).

Key

 GS = Group stage
 QR = Qualifying round
 PR = Preliminary round
 SBInt = Serie B intermediate round
 SCR = Serie C round
 R1 = Round 1
 R2 = Round 2
 R3 = Round 3
 R3 = Round 4

 RInt = Intermediate round
 R64 = Round of 64
 R32 = Round of 32
 QR16 = Round of 16 qualification
 R16 = Round of 16
 QF = Quarter-finals

Seasons

League participations

Notes

References
General

 
 
 

Specific

 
Seasons
Monza